The 1997 Chicago Bears season was their 78th regular season completed in the National Football League (NFL). The team finished with a 4–12 record under head coach Dave Wannstedt. It was the team's first 4-win season since they posted a 4–10 record in 1975. The team allowed a franchise-record 421 points in 1997.

Offseason

NFL draft

Staff

Roster

Regular season

Schedule

Standings

References

External links 

 1997 Chicago Bears at Pro-Football-Reference.com

Chicago Bears
Chicago Bears seasons
Bear
1990s in Chicago
1997 in Illinois